Herina frondescentiae is a species of picture-winged fly in the genus Herina of the family Ulidiidae It is wetland species of about  in length. found in 
Sweden, Finland, Denmark, Latvia, the United Kingdom, Ireland, France, Netherlands, Germany, Spain, Andorra, Italy, Hungary, Romania, Albania, Ukraine, Croatia, Estonia, Poland, Lithuania, the Czech Republic, Slovakia, and Switzerland.

References

External links
Images representing  Herina frondescentiae  at BOLD

Ulidiidae
Flies described in 1758
Diptera of Europe
Taxa named by Carl Linnaeus